European route E 881 is a European B class road in Turkey, connecting the cities Kocaeli and İzmir.

Route 
 
 :  Gebze - İzmir
 : Bornova, İzmir - Balçova, İzmir 
 : İzmir - Çeşme

External links 
 UN Economic Commission for Europe: Overall Map of E-road Network (2007)

International E-road network
Roads in Turkey